A noseclip or nose clip is a device designed to hold the nostrils closed to prevent water from entering, or air from escaping, by people during aquatic activities such as kayaking, freediving, recreational swimming, synchronized swimming and waterdance.

A nose clip is generally made of plastic or of wire covered in rubber or plastic. Nose clips may also have a long band to keep the clip around the neck while it is not being used or a cord to attach the nose clip to goggles or kayaking helmet.

See also
 Nasal strip

References

Synchronized swimming
Canoeing and kayaking equipment
Fishing equipment